Polygonum austiniae, common name Mrs. Austin's knotweed, is a plant species in the buckwheat family. It is native to western Canada and the western United States, from Alberta and British Columbia south as far as California, Nevada, and Wyoming.

References

austiniae
Flora of Western Canada
Flora of the Western United States
Flora of California
Plants described in 1885
Taxa named by Edward Lee Greene